Roberto Azank is an artist of the late 20th century and early 21st century, known primarily for his work as a still life painter. He was born in Buenos Aires, Argentina in 1955; the grandson of an oil canvas artist and the son of a master embroidery designer.

At the age of 14, Roberto won the first prize in painting at his high school; he went on to first study photography and later architecture at the University of Buenos Aires.
In 1979, he moved to the United States where experimentation with various artistic forms and media led to his decision to pursue a career in the arts.  As he continued to hone his craft, Azank began painting brightly colored abstract works in acrylics. By the late eighties, his style had evolved from abstract to figurative and he started painting in oils.

In 1994, Azank moved to New York's Catskill Mountains, settling in New Paltz and found in his still life works the definitive style for which he is known.

The San Francisco Business Times described his work as, "Roberto’s canvases convey a sense of hyper-reality through his bold use of color, precise lines and controlled composition. Common objects such as flowers, fruits, vessels and candles are given new life set against the strong horizon, which divides the artist’s rich color fields. These color fields, often indescribable in hue, are the cornerstone of Azank’s work, while the still life objects act as vehicles for exploration of positive and negative space, placement and scale. He elects to omit unnecessary ornamentation from his compositions, choosing instead to emphasize the precision and draftsmanship he originally investigated in architecture school."

Now at mid career, Roberto Azank has been described as a "metaclassical artist" whose interests lie in the abstract qualities of realism as opposed to the photographic copying of nature.

Selected solo exhibitions
2006: Plus One Gallery, London, England
2006: Eleonore Austerer Gallery, Palm Desert, California
2005: London Art Fair, Plus One Plus Two Galleries, London
2005: Simmons Gallery, San Francisco, California
2005: Unison Arts Center, “Still Life Retrospective”, New Paltz, New York
2005: Eleonore Austerer Gallery, Palm Desert, California
2005: Sande Webster Gallery, “Garden Art”, Philadelphia, Pennsylvania
2004: Center of the Earth Gallery, Charlotte, North Carolina
2004: Patricia Rovzar Gallery, Seattle, Washington
2004: Simmons Gallery, San Francisco, California
2004: London Art Fair, Plus One Plus Two Galleries, London
2004: Plus One Plus Two Galleries, Art London '2004, London
2004: Plus One Plus Two Galleries, “American Realism”, London
2004: Eleonore Austerer Gallery, Palm Desert, California
2003: Bachelier-Cardonsky Gallery, Kent, Connecticut
2003: Vero Beach Museum of Fine Art, “Collector’s Choice”, Vero Beach, Florida
2003: Eleonore Austerer Gallery, San Francisco, California
2003: Center of the Earth Gallery, Charlotte, North Carolina
2003: Addison-Ripley Gallery, Washington, D.C.
2003: Eleonore Austerer Gallery, Palm Springs, California
2003: Plus One Plus Two Galleries, Art London '2003, London
2003: Patricia Rovzar Gallery, Seattle, W
2003: Artspace/Virginia Miller Gallery, “Latin American Invitational”, Miami, Florida
2003: Eleonore Austerer Gallery, “Latin Diversity”, San Francisco, California
2003: Artspace / Virginia Miller Gallery, Arte Americas Miami '2003
2002: Eleonore Austerer Gallery, San Francisco, California
2002: Austerer-Crider Gallery, Palm Springs, California
2002: Center of the Earth Gallery, “The New Realism”, Charlotte, North Carolina
2002: Bachelier-Cardonsky Gallery, “Still Lifes”, Kent, Connecticut
2002: Austerer-Crider Gallery, “Flower Power”, Palm Springs, California
2001: Eleonore Austerer Gallery, San Francisco, California
2001: Gomez Gallery, Baltimore, Maryland
2001: Bachelier-Cardonsky Gallery, Kent, Connecticut
2001: Eleonore Austerer Gallery, Palm Springs Int'l Art Fair
2001: Center of the Earth Gallery, Charlotte, North Carolina
2001: Artspace/Virginia Miller Gallery, Miami, Florida
2001: Lyons-Wier/Packer Gallery, Art Miami '2001
2001: Austerer-Crider Gallery, Palm Springs, California
2000: Byron Cohen Gallery, Kansas City, Missouri
2000: Eleonore Austerer Gallery, Palm Springs Int'l Art Fair
2000: Artspace/Virginia Miller Gallery, Miami, Florida
2000: Center of the Earth Gallery, “The New Masters”, Charlotte, North Carolina
2000: Brewster Arts Limited, Art Miami '2000
1999: Eleonore Austerer Gallery, San Francisco
1999: Artspace/Virginia Miller Gallery, Miami
1999: Brewster Arts Limited, “Major Works”, New York City
1999: William Havu Gallery, Denver, Colorado
1999: Brewster Arts Limited, Art Miami '1999
1999: Brewster Arts Limited, New York City
1999: Addison-Ripley Gallery, Washington, D.C.
1999: Albert Einstein College, Yeshiva University, New York City
1998: Hooks-Epstein Galleries, Houston, Texas
1998: Albert White Gallery, Toronto, Canada
1998: Lizan Tops Gallery, East Hampton, New York
1998: Albers Fine Art Gallery, Memphis, Tennessee
1998: Ramis Barquet Gallery, Art Miami 1998
1998: Artspace/Virginia Miller Gallery, Miami, Florida
1998: Brewster Arts Limited, New York City
1998: Meredith-Kelly Fine Arts, Santa Fe, New Mexico
1998: Elite Fine Art, Miami, Florida
1998: Byron Cohen Gallery, Kansas City, Missouri
1998: Lyons Wier Gallery, Chicago, Illinois
1998: Mulligan-Shanoski Gallery, San Francisco, California
1998: DeArte Magick, ‘Disegno e Colore’, Easton, Pennsylvania
1997: Consulate General of Argentina, New York City
1997: Gallery @ 425 Lexington, New York City
1997: Ramis Barquet Gallery, Art Miami 1997
1997: N.Y. Arts Magazine 2nd City-Wide Biennial, New York City
1993: Art and Mathematics Conference 1993, State University of New York @ Albany, New York
1992: Gallery @ Broward Community College, Ft. Lauderdale, Florida
1991: Marcos J. Alegría School of Fine Arts, Puerto Rico
1991: Olympia and York Gallery, New York City
1990: Galaxy Gallery, ‘Duel in the Sun’, Miami Beach, Florida

Selected publications on the artist 
Who's Who in American Art (1999–2005)
Pulse, Interview by John Nelson. March 31, 2005
Woodstock/New Paltz Times, “Moving Stills”, by Mala Hoffman, April 14, 2005
Desert Post Weekly, “Buenos Aires artist brightly colors Reality”, by Marc Thomson, February 5, 2004
The Miami Herald, “Latin American Art in Coral Gables”, June 29, 2003
Palm Springs Life,”Where to see Roberto Azank”, by Steve Biller, August 2003
Coral Gables Gazette,  “Latin American Masters of Today and Tomorrow”, July 3, 2003.
Washington City Paper, Exhibition Review, by Louis Jacobson, March 7, 2003
“When the Subject is also an Object (Conversations/Solitaire)”, Essay by Lee Klein, published by Addison-Ripley Gallery, February 2003
Old Town Crier, Review by F. Lennox Campello, March 2003
San Francisco Business Times, ”Viewing Art with an Eye towards Capital Growth”, by Lizette Wilson, September 27, 2002
Woodstock-New Paltz Times,”Personally Speaking” by Mala Hoffman, August 22, 2002
Chronogram, “On the Cover”, July 2002
New York Arts Magazine, by Lee Klein, December 2001
San Francisco Examiner, Review, by Anne Lawrence, June 12, 2001.
The Desert Sun, Review by Jean McKig, December 2001
Washington Post, exhibition review by Michael O'Sullivan, March 26, 1999
Wall Street Journal, ‘Inside Art - Trendsetters- Creating the Next Direction’, “Cypherism and	the Age of Computation”, New York, August 1999
Miami Herald, “Cypherism and the Metaclassical Style of Roberto Azank”
Essay by Dr. Ronald Vigo, published by Brewster Arts Ltd., March 1999
”Big Names in the Summer” by Armando Bravo, August 1, 1999
Coral Gables Gazette, ”Gables Gallery exhibits Latin American Jewels”, July 1999
Kansas City Star, ”Still Lifes are Still Effective”, by Robin Trafton, November 26, 1999
Night Magazine, “An Appreciation” by Lee Klein, June 1999
Easton [Pennsylvania] Irregular  - “Disegno e Colore”, by Isadore La Duca, October 1998
Kansas City Star, Review, by Alice Thorsen, July 1998
New York City Arts Magazine, Review ”Art Miami 98”, by Lee Klein, February 1998
New American Paintings, February 1998
Waterfront Week, “Objectification” by F. Chapman, Williamsburg, Brooklyn, New York, May 1997.

Selected collections 
Robert Miller, New York
American Express Financial Advisors, Minneapolis
Sprint Telecommunications, Kansas City
Washington Convention Center, Washington, D.C.

References

External links
 The artist's website - 

1955 births
Living people
Argentine painters
Argentine male painters
Artists from Buenos Aires
People from New Paltz, New York